Zavrh pri Trojanah (in older sources also Za Vrhom) is a small dispersed settlement above Trojane in the Municipality of Lukovica in the eastern part of the Upper Carniola region of Slovenia.

Name
The name of the settlement was changed from Zavrh to Zavrh pri Trojanah in 1953. In the past the German name was Sawerch.

References

External links
 
Zavrh pri Trojanah on Geopedia

Populated places in the Municipality of Lukovica